The 2016 European League of Legends Championship Series (2016 EU LCS) was the fourth season of the European League of Legends Championship Series. 

The Spring Split began on January 16, with a rematch of the 2015 EU LCS Summer playoff finals. Most matches were played at a film studio in Adlershof, Berlin. The finals were played in Rotterdam, Netherlands, at the Rotterdam Ahoy.

The Summer Split was won by G2 Esports, with a roster of Expect, Trick, PerkZ, Zven, Mithy, Relinquished, Kikis, their first title. Most games were being played at Riot Games' studio in Adlershof, Berlin, Germany. The finals were at the Tauron Arena Kraków in Kraków, Poland.

Spring

Rosters

Regular season

Playoffs

Summer

Rosters

Regular season

H2k finished above Fnatic after defeating them in a tiebreaker game

Team Vitality finished above Schalke 04 after defeating them in a tiebreaker game

Playoffs
The semi-finals match between fnatic and H2k was delayed two days due to technical reasons.

EU Regional Qualifiers

References

European League of Legends Championship
European League of Legends Championship Series seasons
European League of Legends Championship
European League of Legends Championship
2016 in Berlin
21st century in Rotterdam
Sports competitions in Rotterdam